Maudit may refer to:

 Mont Maudit, a mountain in the French Alps
 Easton Maudit, a village in Northamptonshire, England
 Maldit, a troubadour's song about a lady's behaviour
 Israel Mauduit (1708–1787), a British merchant, wrote Considerations On The Present German War
 William Maudit, 8th Earl of Warwick (1220–1267), English nobleman, participant in the Barons' War

See also
 Mauduit (disambiguation)